Local government elections took place in London, and some other parts of the United Kingdom on Thursday 8 May 1986.

All London borough council seats were up for election.  The previous Borough elections in London were in 1982. The Labour Party won the most votes and seats in London for the first time since 1974. The party won the most seats in London in 7 out of the next 8 elections.

Results summary

Turnout: 2,312,939 voters cast ballots (45.5%).

Council results

Overall councillor numbers

|}

Borough result maps

References

 
May 1986 events in the United Kingdom
1986